Augusto Palacios (born 23 December 1951) is a Peruvian football coach and a former football player. He's been recently coaching South African club Orlando Pirates in the Premier Soccer League.

During his years as a professional footballer he played for a number of clubs in Peru, Costa Rica, Hong Kong, Venezuela, Finland, West-Germany, South Africa and Australia. He also played six internationals for the Peru national team.

Augusto Palacios has previously managed clubs in South Africa, Peru and Turkey as well as the Hong Kong women's national team and the South Africa national team.

References

External links 
 Augusto Palacios' homepage
 Augusto Palacios at Aussie Footballers
 

Living people
1951 births
Peruvian footballers
Association football forwards
Peru international footballers
Bundesliga players
Sporting Cristal footballers
Club Alianza Lima footballers
Juan Aurich footballers
Deportivo Municipal footballers
C.S. Cartaginés players
Kotkan Työväen Palloilijat players
Deportivo Táchira F.C. players
Sport Boys footballers
Kickers Offenbach players
Mpumalanga Black Aces F.C. players
Canberra City FC players
AmaZulu F.C. players
Manning Rangers F.C. players
Peruvian football managers
South Africa national soccer team managers
Sport Boys managers
Kaizer Chiefs F.C. managers
Gençlerbirliği S.K. managers
Moroka Swallows F.C. managers
Orlando Pirates F.C. managers
Peruvian expatriate footballers
Peruvian expatriate football managers
Peruvian expatriate sportspeople in Costa Rica
Expatriate footballers in Costa Rica
Peruvian expatriate sportspeople in Hong Kong
Expatriate footballers in Hong Kong
Expatriate football managers in Hong Kong
Peruvian expatriate sportspeople in the United States
Expatriate soccer players in the United States
Peruvian expatriate sportspeople in Venezuela
Expatriate footballers in Venezuela
Peruvian expatriate sportspeople in Germany
Expatriate footballers in Germany
Peruvian expatriate sportspeople in South Africa
Expatriate soccer players in South Africa
Expatriate soccer managers in South Africa
Peruvian expatriate sportspeople in Australia
Expatriate soccer players in Australia
Peruvian expatriate sportspeople in Turkey
Expatriate footballers in Turkey
Juan Aurich managers